Alberto Victor Pil Fenix, Jr. (nicknamed Bert or Vic) is a Filipino business entrepreneur, starting, acquiring and growing enterprises where he is a stockholder, director and executive.  His experience has been in several and varied fields.   Currently, he is chairman and president of Fenix Management and Capital, Inc., his family investment holding and management company, president of Ivoclar Vivadent, Inc., a subsidiary of the worldwide and leading company in dental products Ivoclar Vivadent AG; and executive director of SPC Power Corporation which is a publicly-listed electric power and distribution company.  He also sits in the boards of subsidiaries and affiliates of these companies, and as an independent director of another publicly-listed company, DM Wenceslao and Associates, Inc., a real estate development and construction company.

Early life and education
Fenix was born in Manila and grew up in Cotabato City, where he finished grade school in 1956 and high school in 1960, graduating as Valedictorian in both, at the Notre Dame of Cotabato. He was named one of the "Five Outstanding High School Students of the Philippines" in 1960 after a nationwide search sponsored by Philippine Airlines.

He then studied at the Ateneo de Manila University, graduating cum laude in 1964 with an A.B. in Mathematics. He was chosen as a Foreign Student Leader Grantee in 1964 by the United States State Department and he had the opportunity to visit several universities in the United States in the summer of 1963. He was named one of the "Ten Outstanding Students of the Philippines" in 1964. Fenix pursued graduate studies in Industrial Management at the Sloan School of Management of the Massachusetts Institute of Technology in Cambridge, Massachusetts, graduating with an S.M. in 1966, and a Ph.D. in 1968, with distinction as a Sloan School of Management Fellow and Alfred P. Sloan Foundation Fellow, respectively.

Career

In the United States
While in the United States, Fenix worked as a teaching fellow in MIT, a Computer Systems Consultant at the B.F. Goodrich Company in Akron, Ohio, and as a securities investment analyst at the Boston Company, Inc. in Boston, Massachusetts.

Return to the Philippines
Since returning to the Philippines in 1970, Fenix has been a business entrepreneur with experience in an array of sectors. He has been involved in investment and commercial banking, management consulting, real estate development and construction, life and casualty insurance, mining, shipping and logistics, production and processing of agricultural and fishery products, and manufacturing of cement, steel, machinery and parts, dental products, insulation materials, and specialty pulp.

Other activities and affiliations
Fenix also contributes his time serving in government Commissions and Governing Boards. He was a member of the governing board of the Technical Education and Skills Development Authority (TESDA), the Presidential Commission for Educational Reform, the Preparatory Commission for Constitutional Reform, and the Mindanao Development Council. He was a member, then chairman, of the technical panel for business and Management Education at the Commission on Higher Education (CHED). He was a member of the board of regents of the Eulogio "Amang" Rodriguez Institute of Science and Technology, Leyte Normal University and the Southern Leyte State University.  He is currently a member of the board of trustees of the Angeles University Foundation and the AUF Medical Center.

Fenix is an acknowledged business leader, having been national president of the Metalworking Industries Association of the Philippines (MIAP), and the country's largest business organization, the Philippine Chamber of Commerce and Industry (PCCI). He continues to be ex officio member of the PCCI Board as honorary president.  He is also president of the PCCI Human Resources Development Foundation, Inc. since its inception in 2014.

Personal life
Fenix is married to Isabelita Banac. They have seven children and fourteen grandchildren.

References 

Year of birth missing (living people)
Living people
People from Manila
People from Cotabato City
20th-century Filipino businesspeople
Businesspeople from Metro Manila
Ateneo de Manila University alumni
MIT Sloan Fellows
MIT Sloan School of Management alumni
21st-century Filipino businesspeople